Sean Kennedy may refer to:

 Death of Sean Kennedy (1987–2007), American manslaughter victim
 Sean Kennedy (Hollyoaks), a character in UK teen soap opera Hollyoaks
 Sean Kennedy (author) (born 1973), Canadian radio author
 Sean Kennedy (rugby union) (born 1991), Scottish rugby union player
 Sean J. Kennedy (born 1974), American drummer
 Sean Kennedy, a character in UK drama series Hustle
 Sean Kennedy, Canadian musician in rock band Blood Ceremony
 Sean Kennedy (1985–2021), Australian musician, bassist in metalcore band I Killed the Prom Queen